Ellen Scott may refer to:

Ellen Scott, fictional character in Miss Saigon
Ellen Scott, fictional character in The Sands of Time (Sheldon novel)

See also
Helen Scott (disambiguation)